The  is a kei car produced by Honda for the Japanese market. Together with the N-Box, N-One and N-Van, is part of the renewed N lineup of kei class city cars from Honda. The use of the letter "N" in the name was previously used for the late 1960s and 1970s N360.



First generation (JH1/2; 2013) 

The N-WGN was first announced on 26 September 2013. The teasers of the car were revealed on 21 October 2013. The car went on sale on 22 November 2013.

Second generation (JH3/4; 2019) 

The second-generation N-WGN was unveiled on 18 July 2019 and went on sale on 9 August 2019. The facelifted model went on sale on 22 September 2022.

References

External links 

 

N-WGN
Cars introduced in 2013
2020s cars
Kei cars
Hatchbacks
Front-wheel-drive vehicles
All-wheel-drive vehicles
Vehicles with CVT transmission